Fort Basinger is an unincorporated town in Highlands County, Florida that arose around the Second and Third Seminole War fortification: Fort Basinger. Just North of Fort Basinger is Lorida, and just above that is Sebring.

References

Basinger and Fort Basinger, Florida (Ghost Towns)

Former populated places in Florida
Former populated places in Highlands County, Florida